"So Far So Good" is a song by Canadian rock band Thornley. It was released on March 16, 2004, as the lead single from the band's debut studio album, Come Again. It is the first single released by Ian Thornley after the break-up of his previous band, Big Wreck. The song was a hit in both the United States and Canada, peaking at number three on the Canadian Rock airplay chart. The song was featured on the soundtrack to the 2004 comedy film, Going the Distance. The opening riff has been used in commercials for Canadian radio station CFNY-FM.

Charts

References

2004 singles
2004 songs
Songs written by Ian Thornley
Songs written by Jim Vallance
Songs written by Gavin Brown (musician)
Roadrunner Records singles